The Coronation Theatre: Portrait of HM Queen Elizabeth II (oil on canvas) was painted by Ralph Heimans in 2012 to mark the Diamond Jubilee of Queen Elizabeth II. While the sitting took place in Buckingham Palace, the Queen is portrayed in Westminster Abbey, standing at the centre of the Cosmati pavement where she had been crowned 60 years previously. The mosaic pavement, referred to by Shakespeare as "the floor of heaven", is rich in symbolism and was created to evoke the "eternal pattern of the universe". It has been an integral part of the coronation ceremony since Henry III of England and is where every English monarch has been crowned for the last 900 years.

The Queen is depicted wearing a state dress beneath the crimson Robe of State, which she wore to her coronation 60 years previously and which she has worn to the opening of state parliament each year since. Her diamond necklace and earrings, were made by Garrard & Co, jewellers for Queen Victoria's coronation, and were worn by Queen Elizabeth on the day of her coronation in 1953.

The portrait was publicly unveiled on September 28, 2012 by The Governor General of Australia, Dame Quentin Bryce at the National Portrait Gallery of Australia. The portrait formed the centre piece of the Diamond Jubilee Exhibition, "Glorious", where it drew record numbers of visitors to the gallery.

In 2013, Westminster Abbey acquired the portrait through the generosity of Lord Harris of Peckham. Whilst on display in the Chapter House in Westminster Abbey as part of their Coronation Display, the portrait was vandalised by a Fathers for Justice campaigner who struggled with the security guard as he sprayed the word "Help" across the painting in purple paint. The protester was sentenced to 6 months in prison.

The portrait was restored by the Westminster Abbey restoration team and is now on permanent display in the newly opened Diamond Jubilee Gallery in the Triforium of the Abbey.

References

Cultural depictions of Elizabeth II
2012 paintings
Portraits by Australian artists
Portraits of the British Royal Family
Portraits of women
Diamond Jubilee of Elizabeth II
Vandalized works of art in the United Kingdom
Westminster Abbey